The United Sabah National Organisation (abbrev: USNO) was a political party in North Borneo and later Sabah, Malaysia. The widely known Sabah's Muslim indigenous especially Suluk-Bajau ethnic based party was founded by the third Chief Minister of Sabah; Mustapha Harun in December 1961. 

Prior to the formation of Malaysia on 16 September 1963, USNO played a major role in cooperation with United Pasokmomogun Kadazandusun Murut Organisation (UPKO), led by Donald Stephens, and the Federation of Malaya, in attaining independence from the British. UPKO was then dissolved and merged into USNO in 1967.

The party came into power after winning the 1967 state election. USNO remained in power until 1975 under Mustapha's leadership, and until 1976 under Mohammad Said Keruak's leadership.

In 1975, USNO's secretary-general Harris Salleh quit the party and teamed up with former UPKO leader Stephens who had become Sabah Governor and had returned to politics to create a new party called Sabah People's United Front (BERJAYA). This new party defeated USNO in the 1976 state election to form government until 1985. USNO consistently continued to participate in state elections of 1981, 1985, 1986, and 1990, winning several state electorates, however never enough to form government again.

After the 1990 state election when BERJAYA themselves were ousted by United Sabah Party (PBS), Mustapha returned to team-up with Harris again in a merger of USNO and BERJAYA for his long-envisaged initiative to create the Sabah chapter of peninsula-based United Malays National Organisation (UMNO) with Mustapha himself became its first chief of UMNO Sabah. In 1996, USNO was finally de-registered by the federal Registrar of Societies (RoS). Six of its legislators joined the Sabah UMNO while the rest joined the opposition PBS.

General election results

State election results

See also 
 Politics of Malaysia
 List of political parties in Malaysia
 United Sabah National Organisation (New) (USNO Baru)

References

Further reading

Defunct political parties in Sabah
1961 establishments in North Borneo
1996 disestablishments in Malaysia
Political parties established in 1961
Political parties disestablished in 1996